The Miss Brazil World 2001 pageant took place on September 28, 2001. It was 16th edition of the contest. Each state and the Federal District competed for their state and went to compete for the title of the Brazilian Crown for Miss World. The winner entered Miss World 2001. This year was the first time that Miss Brazil World was separated from the main pageant, Miss Brazil, for only 1 year. Joyce Yara Silva Aguiar of São Paulo ended being the winner at the end of the contest and also the first black woman to be Miss Brazil World. This contest was held separate from Miss Brazil 2001 and was apart from the latter for only a year before rejoining with the main contest the following year.

Results

Delegates
The delegates for Miss Brazil World 2001 were:

 - Joyce Áudria de Oliveira Garcia de Lazaris
 - Lívia Regina Costa Tavares
 - Jakeline Almeida Amanajás
 - Vivian Cristina Rodrigues Cavalcanti
 - Oldeane Ribeiro da Fonseca
 - Fernanda de Souza Lourenço
 - Vanusa Aparecida de Paula
 - Ineri Lidig
 - Lara Andressa de Brito
 - Michele Cristine de Paula
 - Cristina Ramos Lago
 - Fernanda Friolli Pinto
 - Andréia de Paula Moreira Brito
 - Ana Paula da Silva Lessa
 - Sásckya Sabrynna Almeida Porto
 - Ana Carla de Godoy
 - Débora Michelle de Araújo Daggy
 - Juceline de Souza Nóbrega
 - Raquel Santos de Faria
 - Suzana Schott da Silveira
 - Nathália Urdini
 - Elizângela Alves do Nascimento
 - Anna Carolina de Paula
 - Simone Régis
 - Joyce Yara Silva Aguiar
 - Karina da Costa Barreto 
 - Nathália Lourenço Rodrigues

References

External links
 Official site (in Portuguese)

2001
2001 in Brazil
2001 beauty pageants